is a novel depicting the "floating world" of Edo period Japan, written by  and published in 1686.

Plot summary
They meet an old woman who lives in a grass hut and listen to the story of her life experiences. At each stage, the woman tried to free herself from the situations she found herself in, but was trapped by her own nature causing her to fail.

Adaptation
The  film Life of Oharu is based upon this novel.

References

External links
 Information on the English language editions of the book in Google Books.

1686 novels
Edo-period works
Novels about geisha
Japanese novels adapted into films
Works by Ihara Saikaku